Qashqejeh (also known as Ghashghajeh, Qeshqajeh, and Qāshqejeh) is a village in Zarrineh Rud Rural District, Bizineh Rud District, Khodabandeh County, Zanjan Province, Iran. At the 2006 census, its population was 1,146, with 244 families.

References 

Populated places in Khodabandeh County